The Chinese Ambassador to the Federated States of Micronesia is the official representative of the People's Republic of China to the Federated States of Micronesia.

List of representatives

China–Federated States of Micronesia relations

References 

 
China
Micronesia Federated States of